Button Men is a dice game for two players invented by James Ernest of Cheapass Games and first released in 1999.

The length of games are short, typically taking less than ten minutes to play. Each player is represented by a pin-back button or playing card of their choice. The buttons are metal or plastic discs, about 2–2.5 inches (5–6.5 cm) in diameter, with a pin on back that can be used to fasten them to clothing. A button bears the name and illustration of the combatant ("Button Man" or "fighter") assumed by the player. Each button indicates the quantity and maximum value (and abilities if any) of the player's dice.

Background and history
Button Men is a game designed for fan conventions and other public venues. It can be played almost anywhere on short notice (provided the dice are at hand), and games are quick to complete. Buttons are meant to be worn on clothing, bags, or other accessories, advertising that the wearer has a button to play with and is open to challenges. Buttons also frequently advertise something else, such as a company, a webcomic, or another game. The Sluggy Freelance set of buttons, for example, features characters from that comic, and the Brawl set features characters from another Cheapass game. 

In 2000, Button Men won the Origins Awards for Best Abstract Board Game of 1999 and Best Graphic Presentation of a Board Game 1999.

Button Men can easily be extended simply by creating more buttons. Many are now out of print, though many others are still available, primarily via purchase from the Cheapass Games web site. Companies other than Cheapass must pay a licensing fee to use the Button Men artwork in distributing their own buttons.

In 2009, Thrust Interactive released an iPhone version of the game in collaboration with Cheapass Games.

In 2011, Cheapass Games began "ransoming" their older and out-of-print games in an experiment to apply the "freemium" business model to board games. Button Men was revamped into a trading-card format that can be easily printed on a standard inkjet and cut apart for gameplay. The original base set, "Soldiers", and the first expansion set, "Vampyres", have both been released in this new format and made available for anyone to download, print and play with at no monetary cost.

Online Game
Button Men Online, a website initially developed by Dana Huyler and officially endorsed by Cheapass Games, allows users to play games over the internet via a web-based interface. Button Men Online features most of the printed buttons, an additional 250+ "buttons" that exist only on the site, and a random button generator. In 2003, Button Men Online won the Origins Award for Best Play-by-mail Game of 2002. In February 2012, Button Men Online went offline due to server problems. After nine months of downtime, a number of the players from Button Men Online got together and recreated an open-source version of the site. The new version of Button Men Online went online in March 2014. Button Men Online requires you to register with a username and email, but is free to play.

Gameplay

Players play several rounds, first rolling a set of Dice, and then playing several turns in which, they target their opponent's Dice with their own to capture, take control of, or neutralize them, based on their current values. The first player to win three rounds wins the game.

Set up
At the start of a game, players select a fighter and collect the necessary dice (see "The Dice", below). Players keep the same fighter throughout the game.

The Dice
Each player starts each round with several Dice of various sizes (maximum values), each represented by one or more physical dice, as specified by the numbers and letters on their fighter's button. 
Basic Dice: When a Die is specified by a number, the player must use a die of that size.
Swing Dice: When a Die is specified by a letter (a Turbo, Turbo Swing, or Mood Swing Die), the player, must select a die with an integral size from the upper through the lower limits indicated:

If a fighter has more than one Swing Die of a given letter, each of those dice must be the same.
Option Dice: When a Die is specified by two values separated by a line, the player must select one die of either size.
Twin Dice: When a Die is specified by two numbers in an oblong frame, the player must use two dice of those sizes. These are played for all purposes (rolled, targeted, scored, etc.) as a single Die.
Additional symbols specify special Dice, with special abilities defined below. Though (with the exception of Auxiliary, Reserve, and Winslow Dice) these abilities do not require selection of dice beyond those listed above, players may find it convenient to use different colored dice to distinguish them from other dice. Players may make new selections (e.g. for Swing and Option Dice, a Reserve Die, or any other special dice with variable powers or sizes) at the start of each round. However, in tournament play, the winner of the previous round must always reset to the dice he started that round with. Any sizes (e.g., Turbo Swing, Mood Swing, Mighty, etc.) or abilities (e.g., Rage, Thief, etc.) that changed during the previous round are reset, and all dice are returned to their original owners.

Starting a round
Take all of your fighter's dice and roll them. Whoever rolled the single lowest number will go first. If the lowest Dice are tied, compare the next lowest dice, and so on until a leader is determined. (Note that certain special Dice are not used in determining who goes first.)

The Turn
Starting with the player who gained initiative, players take turns during which the current player must take one of the following actions, if possible.

Normal Attacks (unless otherwise stated, all Dice may make these attacks):
Power Attack: Use one Die (except a Shadow Die) to capture one target Die of equal or lower value. Then re-roll the capturing Die.
Skill Attack: Use several Dice to capture one target Die of value exactly equal to the sum of their values. Then re-roll the capturing Dice.
Special Attacks (only specified Dice may make these attacks):
Shadow Attack: Use one Shadow Die to capture one target Die, where the target Die's value is between the attacking Shadow Die's value and size, inclusive. Then re-roll the capturing Die.
Speed Attack: Use one Speed Die to capture any number of target Dice whose values add up exactly to its value. Then re-roll the capturing Die.
Trip Attack: Roll one Trip Die and one target Die. Then, if the Trip Die is now of equal or greater value than the target, the target is captured. (Can only be made if there is a non-zero chance of capture.)
Thief Attack: Use a Thief Die to take control of a target Die of equal or lower value. The Thief Die can no longer be used or attacked.
Berserk Attack: Use a Berserker Die to perform a Speed Attack, then, before re-rolling, replace the attacking Die with a non-Berserker Die half its size (rounded up).
Sleep Attack: Roll one Sleep Die and one target Die of greater value. The target die may not be used on its owner's next turn.
Teleport (only Teleport Dice take this action): Swap one Teleport Die with a target Die, which now becomes a Teleport Die. Then re-roll the new Die.

Round end
Scoring: When both players pass, the round is over. For each Die a player captured, he scores its size in points. For each Die under his control (not in reserve), he scores half its size. The highest score wins the round, and the first player to win three rounds wins the game. (Poison, Deception, and Value Dice are scored differently.)

Ties: If any round is a draw, re-play it.

Special Dice
Special Dice, with abilities that modify the rules above, are indicated in a variety of ways, usually with a combination of symbol and changed field color (which varies from one set to another).

In brief these abilities are:

 Armor: Value is added to non-Armor Dice in defense.
 Auxiliary: An additional optional Die the players may agree to use before a game.
 Berserker: No Skill Attack, Berserk Attack
 Chance: If player will not be going first: May re-roll one Chance. Opponent may follow suit.
 Constant: Only rolled at start of round. No Power Attack; in Skill Attacks, may be subtracted from attack total (which may never be <1)
 Deception: Worth 4 for scoring.
 Evil: Can make simultaneous Power Attacks, No Skill Attack.
 Fire: No Power Attack. May increase values of attacking Dice (up to their size) in Power or Skill Attack adjusting own value downward accordingly.
 Focus: If player will not be going first, and doing so would acquire it: May reduce values of any Focus Dice. Opponent my follow suit. Reduced Dice may not be used in first attack.
 Game: Once per game: may re-roll Game Dice at any time.
 Insult: Cannot be captured by Skill attacks.
 Loaded/Maximum: Value always equals size.  This ability was named differently in two separate sets.
 Mighty: Whenever re-rolled for any reason: replace with the next largest regular die.
 Mood Swing: Size must be changed randomly, with equal likelihood, to a regular size in the specified range, before each re-roll.
 Morphing: After Morphing Dice are used in an attack, they become the same size as the Die that was captured.
 Null: Null Dice are worth no points and any Dice they capture are worth no points.
 Ornery: Ornery Dice re-roll after every turn, whether they took part in an attack or not
 Plasma: At the start of a game, and after each lost round (or after more than three tied rounds), a player can select which set of skills are active for the next round.
 Poison: Captured Poison Dice are worth minus half of their face value; controlled Poison dice are worth minus their face value.
 Queer: Queer Dice behave like Shadow Dice when they show an odd number.
 Rage: Do not count towards going first. Becomes a normal Die once used in an attack. If captured, is replaced by a normal Die of the same size.
 Rebound: Re-roll when captured; If the die roll is higher than its value before re-roll it captures the largest attacking die.
 Reserve: Reserve Dice are set aside at the start of the game. After losing a round, one Reserve may be added to the Dice under the player's control for the remainder of the game.
 Shadow: No Power Attack; Shadow Attack.
 Sleep: Do not count towards going first. Sleep Attack.
 Slow: Do not count towards going first.
 Specialty: Can be one type of Dice from the following: Insult, Loaded, Poison, Shadow, Speed or Trip.
 Speed: Speed Attack.
 Stealth: No Power Attack. May only be captured by Skill Attacks.
 Stinger: Do not count towards going first. In a Skill Attack, may be used as any number between 1 and their value.
 Teleport: Teleport.
 Thief: No Power Attack; Thief Attack.
 Time & Space: After any re-roll results in an odd value on a Time & Space Die, owner takes another turn.
 Trip: Do not count towards going first. Trip Attack.
 Turbo Swing: Size may be changed before each re-roll.
 Value: Scored as if its size where its current value. Dice captured by Value Dice become Value Dice.
 Weak: Whenever re-rolled for any reason: replace with the next smallest regular die.
 Winslow: An additional optional Die the players may agree to use before a game to replace one Swing Die. Value is always 1; size is 30. Capturing player takes control.

Strategy and the meta-game
Not all Button Men are evenly matched against one another. Though designers attempt to balance a Button Man's strengths and weaknesses, necessarily it happens that some arrangements of die sizes and skills are more likely to win games than others. Buttons that are exceptionally powerful (or that have problematic special abilities) may be declared not to be "tournament legal" by Cheapass Games, meaning that tournament organizers should consider disallowing those buttons. Most illegal buttons are rare or promotional ones with unusual die skills or special rules. All buttons that have not been licensed from Cheapass (including all of those that exist only on the Button Men Online web site) are illegal by default.

Button Men Online maintains statistics on the hundreds of thousands of games that have been played on the site. Among tournament legal Button Men, win percentages range from the mid-teens to the high sixties.

Therefore, part of the strategy of the game is to begin by selecting a relatively powerful button. However, buttons may be stronger or weaker when playing against other buttons with certain characteristics. For example, a button with small Poison dice might be powerful in general because it has fewer dice worth positive points for its opponent to capture. However, a button with large Shadow dice might be powerful against that button specifically because it can allow the round to end with the Poison and Shadow dice unable to capture each other, and therefore still counted towards their owners' scores.

Swing and Option dice help to offset buttons' natural strengths and weaknesses by ensuring that a button's number of sides need not be exactly the same from one round to the next. Tournament organizers may also choose to minimize the importance of the "meta-game" of button selection (usually with the idea of shifting importance to the players' skill) by somehow penalizing stronger buttons, or by enforcing random button selection.

However, chance plays a large role in Button Men; it is always possible for a 20-sided die to roll a 1 at an inopportune time. Among tournament legal buttons, at least, no match-up is impossible for either side to win. Inevitably it happens that a weaker Button Man or a less skilled player will claim some improbable victories due to lucky die rolls. This effect is offset somewhat, however, by the rule that a player must win three rounds to win a game.

Articles on Cheapass' "official fan site" discuss questions of strategy such as choosing the optimal size for Swing or Option dice (including a mathematical formula for how many sides the "larger" Button Man must keep in order to win), and determining which capture to make to have the best chance of protecting one's remaining dice.

Reception
It's quick and fun, but requires some thinking. And some luck. A great game."
m

In 1999 Pyramid magazine named Button Men as one of the Millennium's Best Games.  Editor Scott Haring said "This game just gets more and more impressive every time I look at it. ... the idea is so simple, and the strategy so subtle . . . I've never figured out exactly how to master this game, and I suspect that's because there is no good way to do so."

Reviews
Backstab #15

References

External links
 Button Men Online Play Button Men online (free login required)
 Cheapass Games "double-secret website"
 The Button Men fan page from Cheapass Games
 Button Filter A list of buttons with skills that you can filter by skill et al.
 

Cheapass Games games
Dice games
Origins Award winners